Plasmodium hegneri is a parasite of the genus Plasmodium subgenus Giovannolaia.

Like all Plasmodium species P. hegneri has both vertebrate and insect hosts. The vertebrate hosts for this parasite are birds.

Description 

The parasite was first described by Manwell and Kuntz in 1966.

It is related to the following species

Plasmodium asanum
Plasmodium circumflexum
Plasmodium durae
Plasmodium fallax
Plasmodium formosanum
Plasmodium gabaldoni
Plasmodium lophrae
Plasmodium lophrae
Plasmodium pediocetti
Plasmodium pinotti
Plasmodium polare

Geographical occurrence 

This species was originally isolated in Taiwan but is likely to be much more widespread.

Clinical features and host pathology 

This species infects the common or European teal (Anas crecca).

References 

hegneri
Parasites of birds